Kyle Jeffrey Lauletta (born March 17, 1995) is an American football quarterback for the New Jersey Generals of the United States Football League (USFL). He played college football at Richmond and was drafted by the New York Giants in the fourth round of the 2018 NFL Draft. He has also been a member of the Philadelphia Eagles, Atlanta Falcons, Jacksonville Jaguars, and Pittsburgh Maulers.

Early life
Lauletta attended the East campus of Downingtown High School in Downingtown, Pennsylvania, and was the starting quarterback for the Cougars football team for his last two years. He  came from a family of football players; his father Joe and uncle Lex played quarterback and punter for Navy, respectively, and two of his brothers have also been quarterbacks for Downingtown East. In his first start, he threw for 400 yards and ran for two touchdowns against the defending state champions. He also played lacrosse.  Despite his accolades in high school, an off-season injury and bad luck largely prevented any premium FBS schools from recruiting Lauletta, and he eventually chose to attend Richmond.

College career
Lauletta played at Richmond from 2013 to 2017. He tore his ACL in 2016 on a quarterback scramble after leading Richmond to an 8–2 record at the time, but recovered and played all games in 2017, his best statistical season. During his collegiate career, he threw for a school-record 10,465 yards and 73 touchdowns. Lauletta was invited to play in the 2018 Senior Bowl, in which he threw for 198 yards and three touchdowns and was named the game's MVP.

College statistics

Professional career

New York Giants
Lauletta was selected by the New York Giants in the fourth round (108th overall) of the 2018 NFL Draft. The pick used to acquire him was traded from the Tampa Bay Buccaneers in exchange for Jason Pierre-Paul.

On October 30, 2018, Lauletta was arrested in Weehawken, New Jersey, after being pulled over in his Jaguar on the way to Giants team practice. He was charged with eluding police, a third-degree crime; obstructing administration of law and resisting arrest, motor vehicle charges for reckless driving, disregarding an officer's directions, an improper turn in a marked traffic lane and failure to remain in a marked lane. Lauletta had previously been charged with reckless driving in Fairfax County, Virginia, in 2017 and found guilty of failure to obey a highway sign.

Lauletta made his first NFL appearance on December 9 in relief of Eli Manning in a 40–16 victory against the Washington Redskins. He threw five incompletions and an interception to Mason Foster in the fourth quarter, for a passer rating of 0.0. He appeared in one other game, Week 17 against the Dallas Cowboys as a blocker, in the 2018 season.

Lauletta was waived during final roster cuts on August 31, 2019.

Philadelphia Eagles
Lauletta signed with the Philadelphia Eagles' practice squad on September 1, 2019. He signed a reserve/future contract with the Eagles on January 6, 2020. He was waived on August 17, 2020.

Lauletta had a tryout with the New York Jets on August 19, 2020.

Atlanta Falcons 
Lauletta was signed by the Atlanta Falcons on September 2, 2020. Three days later on September 5, 2020, Lauletta was waived by the Falcons and re-signed to the practice squad. He was released on September 22, 2020.

Cleveland Browns 
On October 16, 2020, Lauletta was signed to the Cleveland Browns' practice squad.

Lauletta was signed to a reserve/futures contract by the Browns on January 18, 2021. Lauletta was waived by the Browns on August 31, 2021.

Jacksonville Jaguars 
On September 2, 2021, Lauletta was signed to the Jacksonville Jaguars' practice squad.

Cleveland Browns (second stint)
On December 17, 2021, Lauletta was signed off the Jaguars' practice squad to the Cleveland Browns' active roster. He was waived by the Browns on January 4, 2022.

Pittsburgh Maulers
On February 22, 2022, Lauletta was drafted in the 1st round with the seventh pick of the 2022 USFL Draft by the Pittsburgh Maulers. He was released on May 25, 2022.

New Jersey Generals
On May 25, 2022, Lauletta was claimed off waivers by the New Jersey Generals.

Statistics

References

External links

Richmond Spiders bio

1995 births
Living people
American football quarterbacks
Atlanta Falcons players
Cleveland Browns players
Jacksonville Jaguars players
New York Giants players
New Jersey Generals (2022) players
Philadelphia Eagles players
Players of American football from Pennsylvania
Richmond Spiders football players
Sportspeople from Chester County, Pennsylvania
Pittsburgh Maulers (2022) players